Northern Pacific Airways is an upcoming low-cost airline based in Anchorage, Alaska, United States, that plans to commence operations in Summer 2023.

History
The airline also operates inside Alaska under the brand and is the same company as Ravn Alaska.  Ravn Connect is a separate company but also a subsidiary of FLOAT Alaska. The airline plans to operate transpacific flights between North America and Asia, with a stopover at Ted Stevens Anchorage International Airport. The airline's business model has been compared to that of Icelandair. Northern Pacific will allow passengers to either quickly connect to their next flight, or to have a longer multi-day stopover at Anchorage to allow passengers to sightsee in Alaska.

Destinations
While exact routes have not been scheduled yet, the airline plans to fly to destinations such as Tokyo, Osaka, Seoul, Los Angeles, Las Vegas, San Francisco, New York City and Orlando from Ted Stevens Anchorage International Airport. Due to the ongoing closure of Russian airspace and delays in certification from Korean and Japanese authorities the airline is planning to launch with flights to Mexico first. Northern Pacific Airways has since announced service to Las Vegas and Ontario, California

Fleet
As of September 2022, Northern Pacific owns four Boeing 757-200s and has plans to acquire six more that used to be operated by American Airlines. Each seats about 200 passengers, and NP plans to have about twelve of the aircraft by their transpacific launch. Northern Pacific unveiled their first Boeing 757 in their livery on January 18, 2022.

See also
List of airlines of the United States
Norse Atlantic Airways – Another low-cost carrier with a similar name

References

External Links
Northern Pacific Airways Official site.
Ravn Alaska Official site.

Low-cost carriers
Airlines based in Alaska
Companies based in Anchorage, Alaska
American companies established in 2021
Airlines established in 2021